Two Lone Swordsmen were a British electronic music duo from London, consisting of Andrew Weatherall and Keith Tenniswood.

History
Formed by Andrew Weatherall and Keith Tenniswood in 1996, following the dissolution of Weatherall's the Sabres of Paradise, Two Lone Swordsmen released material on the record label Emissions Audio Output, run by Weatherall. However, the small nature of the operation limited the duo's success and they subsequently signed to Warp.

Two Lone Swordsmen's debut studio album, The Fifth Mission (Return to Flightpath Estate), was released in 1996. 1998's Stay Down was placed at number 22 on Pitchforks "50 Best IDM Albums of All Time" list. Tiny Reminders (2000) was placed at number 19 on Pitchforks "Top 20 Albums of 2000" list. The duo released From the Double Gone Chapel in 2004.

On 17 February 2020, Weatherall died due to a pulmonary embolism at the age of 56. Weatherall's death marked the end of Two Lone Swordsmen, as Tenniswood decided to fold the group.

Discography

Studio albums
 The Fifth Mission (Return to Flightpath Estate) (Emissions Audio Output, 1996)
 Stay Down (Warp, 1998)
 Tiny Reminders (Warp, 2000)
 From the Double Gone Chapel (Warp, 2004)
 Wrong Meeting (Rotters Golf Club, 2007)
 Wrong Meeting II (Rotters Golf Club, 2007)

Compilation albums
 Further Reminders (Warp, 2001)
 Peppered with Spastic Magic: A Collection of Two Lone Swordsmen Remixes (RGC, 2003)
 Emissions Audio Output: From the Archive Vol/01 (RGC, 2006)

Album-length EPs
 Swimming Not Skimming (Emissions Audio Output, 1996) – limited release
 Stockwell Steppas (Emissions Audio Output, 1997) – limited release

EPs
 The Third Mission (Emissions Echoic, 1996)
 The Tenth Mission (Emissions Audio Output, 1996)
 Two Lone Swordsmen and a Being (Special Emissions, 1996) 
 The Role of Linoleum (Humboldt County, 1997) 
 D.C.Fumes EP (New Emissions, 1997) 
 A Bag of Blue Sparks (Warp, 1998)
 A Virus with Shoes (Warp, 1999)
 Receive Tactical Support (Warp, 1999)
 Klunk (Subvert, 1999) 
 Locked Swords (Warp, 2001)
 Benicassim EP (RGC, 2001) 
 For Shavers Only (RGC, 2001) 
 Dark Eldar (Art of Perception, 2001) 
 Big Silver Shining Motor of Sin E.P. (Warp, 2004)

Singles
 "Stuka" (Creation Records, 1997) 
 "Tuning Up!" (Soundboy Entertainment, 1997) 
 "The Gates to Film City" (Domino Recording Company, 1998) 
 "Have You Ever Wondered Who Really Writes the Tabloids' Club Columns?" (Slut Smalls, 1999)
 "Nostik" / "Tall Lights" (C-Pij, 1999) 
 "Tiny Reminder No1 (C-Pij Remix Vocal)" / "Tiny Reminder No1 (C-Pij Remix)" (Warp, 2001)
 "Vous Do Funk?" / "Awoken by Beetles" (Voodoo, 2001) 
 "Explode" / "Fly Bi Wire" (Firewire, 2002) 
 "Untitled" (Hidden Library, 2002) 
 "Sex Beat" (Warp, 2004)

References

External links
 Official website (archive)
 
 

English electronic music duos
Electronic dance music duos
Male musical duos
Musical groups established in 1996
Musical groups disestablished in 2020
Musical groups from London
Creation Records artists
Warp (record label) artists